Cholsey railway station (previously Cholsey & Moulsford) serves the village of Cholsey in south Oxfordshire, England, and the nearby town of Wallingford.

The station is managed by Great Western Railway, which operates local services to Didcot Parkway,  Reading and London Paddington. Cholsey is also the junction for the heritage railway services on the Cholsey and Wallingford Railway. The station has five platforms, but two of them are generally out of use so fast trains can pass through, with gates closed. These platforms are opened when the lines through the other two main line platforms are closed for maintenance. Platform 5 is only used for services on the preserved Cholsey and Wallingford railway.

Layout
The station frontage building is on two levels, with station offices in the lower (street) level and the London bound waiting room on the upper (platform) level. There are two small car parks, one at street level in front of the station building, the other at platform level to the south of the station.

The station has platforms on each of the fast and relief (slow) lines, although the platforms on the fast lines see little use. It also has a terminal platform used by trains on the Wallingford line. The platforms are located on an embankment, with access to street level by stairs and a pedestrian underpass.
Platform 1 – is only used when the relief lines are out of service. It is for down GWR services during engineering and maintenance work.
Platform 2 – is only used when the relief lines are out of service. It is for up GWR services during engineering and maintenance work.
Platform 3 – for down GWR local services towards  and Oxford.

High-speed passenger and freight trains pass through platforms 1 – 4 with little or no warning.

History
 
The station is on the original line of the Great Western Railway, which opened on 1 June 1840.
The original station, opened with the line and known as Wallingford Road, was several hundred yards further up the main line towards , just east of the point where the A329 road crosses the line. Some of the original station buildings can still be seen at this point.

In 1892, during quadrupling of the main line, the junction for Wallingford was resited closer to the point of divergence and a new station was built there. On 29 February 1892 the new station opened and Moulsford station closed.

The Wallingford branch closed to passenger trains in 1959 and to freight trains in 1981. Part of it is now preserved as the Cholsey and Wallingford Railway.

Services

Services run every 30 minutes in each direction Monday to Saturday and hourly on Sundays. Typical journey times are approximately 7 minutes to Didcot Parkway,  20 minutes to Reading and Oxford, and just over 1 hour to Paddington.

Services on the volunteer-run Cholsey and Wallingford railway run intermittently, usually on weekends and bank holidays.

References

External links

 Train times for main line services, from National Rail
 Train times for heritage services, from Cholsey and Wallingford Railway
 Station information, from National Rail

Railway stations in Oxfordshire
DfT Category E stations
Former Great Western Railway stations
Railway stations in Great Britain opened in 1892
Railway stations served by Great Western Railway
Great Western Main Line